U.D.O. are a German heavy metal band from Solingen. Formed in 1987 by eponymous vocalist Udo Dirkschneider following his departure from Accept, the group originally included guitarists Mathias Dieth and Peter Szigeti, bassist Frank Rittel and drummer Thomas Franke. The band released their debut album Animal House before the end of the year, after which Szigeti, Rittel and Franke were replaced by Andy Susemihl, Thomas Smuszynski (after a brief tenure for former Accept bassist Dieter Rubach) and future Accept drummer Stefan Schwarzmann, respectively. Wolla Böhm replaced Susemihl for 1990's Faceless World, although by the time of the next album Timebomb, U.D.O. were a four-piece. In 1992, after touring in promotion of Timebomb, U.D.O. disbanded as Dirkschneider returned to the reformed Accept.

Dirkschneider reformed U.D.O. in 1996 with Dieth and Schwarzmann, plus former Accept drummer Stefan Kaufmann on guitar and Michael Voss on bass, to record "Metal Gods" for A Tribute to Judas Priest: Legends of Metal. Dieth and Voss were soon replaced by Bullet members Jürgen Graf and Fitty Wienhold, respectively, for the band's next album Solid. Schwarzmann left after the release of No Limits. Graf also left around the same time, with Igor Gianola taking his place in time for the recording of Holy. Drums on the album were credited to "Guess Who", but were likely programmed by Kaufmann who did the same on earlier albums.

Schwarzmann's replacement was Lorenzo Milani, who joined U.D.O. in November 1999. Milani remained until January 2005, when he left the band for "personal reasons" and was replaced by Francesco Jovino, who had earlier filled in for the regular drummer during a tour the previous autumn. This lineup remained stable for over seven years, before Kaufmann left in September 2012 for "health reasons". He was replaced the following January by Andrey Smirnov, just days before Gianola was also replaced by Kasperi Heikkinen. Jovino left for "personal reasons" in December 2014, with Dirkschneider's son Sven taking his place the following February. Heikkinen remained until February 2017 before leaving, also citing "personal reasons" for his departure from both U.D.O. and related band Dirkschneider.

Bill Hudson took over from Heikkinen in March 2017, but by the following April had left due to musical differences. The band were temporarily rejoined by Kaufmann for a string of summer festival appearances. Shortly after the release of Steelfactory, long-time bassist Fitty Wienhold announced his departure from U.D.O., but assured fans that he would continue to offer his support in the form of songwriting if requested. The following month, the band announced the additions of guitarist Dee Dammers in place of Hudson, and bassist Tilen Hudrap in place of Wienhold.

Members

Current

Former

Touring

Timeline

Lineups

References

External links
U.D.O. official website

U.D.O.